NGC 1531 is a dwarf galaxy in the constellation Eridanus that is interacting with the larger spiral galaxy NGC 1532.
It was discovered by John Herschel on 19 October 1835. Although technically classified as a peculiar lenticular galaxy, the galaxy's structure is better described as amorphous.

See also
NGC 4627 - a similar interacting dwarf galaxy
M51B - a similar interacting dwarf galaxy

References

External links
 
 
 
 
 

Lenticular galaxies
Dwarf galaxies
Peculiar galaxies
Interacting galaxies
Eridanus (constellation)
1531
14635
Discoveries by John Herschel